The Suluhu Cabinet was officially formed in Tanzania on 31 March 2021. Following the death of former president John Magufuli, Samia Suluhu Hassan the Vice President in the previous cabinet was sworn in as the new president. Within two weeks of her assignment, she appointed a new vice president and reshuffled the previous cabinet.

First Term

Inaugural Cabinet
This marks the first cabinet in Tanzanian history with a female president. The inaugural cabinet was confirmed on 31 March 2021.

Changes 

 On 2 August 2021, Elias John Kwandikwa died.

First Cabinet Reshuffle
Suluhu conducted her first major cabinet reshuffle on September 12, 2021. Dr Stergomena Tax filled the empty seat of Kwandikwa as the Minister of Defence and National Service as the first female to hold the position in the country's history. A new attorney general was also appointed Dr Eliezer Feleshi replaced Adelardus Kilangi.

Second Cabinet Reshuffle
On 31 December 2021 Samia Suluhu gave her first new years address to the nation. During the address, she hinted that she would be carrying out a cabinet reshuffle to expel ministers she suspects of siding with rival politicians in the party. On 8 January 2022 she announced her new cabinet, reshuffling ministers and creating two new cabinet positions. The first being the Prime Minister's Office Policy, Parliamentary Affairs, Labour, Employment, Youth and the Disabled was split into two: Policy and Parliament Affairs; and Labour, Youth, Employment and Persons with Disabilities. The second being the split of the Ministry of Health, Community Development, Gender, Seniors and Children into the Minister of Health Development, Seniors and Children; and the Ministry of Community Development & Gender.

All new ministers resumed their new post on 10 January 2022.

Changes 

 On 1 April 2022, president Suluhu made a small shift of the dockets of three ministers. Minister George Simbachawene moves to the Office of the Prime Minister - Parliament, Policy and Coordination, replacing Dr Pindi Chana. Dr Chana moved to the Ministry of Natural Resources and Tourism, replacing Dr Damas Ndumabro. Dr Ndumabro takes over Simbacawene's previous role as the Minister of Constitutional and Legal Affairs.
 On 2 October 2022, president Suluhu dropped Liberata Mulamula as the Minister of Foreign Affairs, E.A.C., Regional and International Cooperation, and replaced her with Dr Stergomena Tax. Dr Tax's previous post as the Minister of Defense was given to Innocent Bashungwa. Innocent's previous post as Minister of State in the President’s Office Regional Administration and Local Government was given to Angellah Kairuki.
 On 14 February 2023, Mohamed Mchengerwa switched cabinet positions with Pindi Chana and became the new Minister of Natural Resources and Tourism and Pindi Chana became the new Minister of Culture, Artists and Sports.
 On 26 February 2023, Abdallah Ulega was promoted to be the Minister for Livestock and Fisheries, replacing Mashimba Ndaki. In the re-shuffle, the Ministry for Investment was moved into the presidents office.

References

External links

Samia Suluhu
Cabinets established in 2021